Tongxiang railway station is a railway station on the Shanghai–Hangzhou high-speed railway located in northern Zhejiang, China.  It is located south of Tongxiang, a city in Jiaxing Prefecture. It has two platforms, and is only served by high-speed EMU G and D trains. It opened on 26 October 2010.

References

Railway stations in Zhejiang
Tongxiang
Railway stations in China opened in 2010